Han Song-hee (born 8 May 1983) is a track and road cyclist from South Korea. She represented her nation at the 2004 Summer Olympics in the women's road race.

References

External links
 profile at Cyclingarchives.com

South Korean female cyclists
Cyclists at the 2004 Summer Olympics
Olympic cyclists of South Korea
Living people
Place of birth missing (living people)
Asian Games medalists in cycling
Cyclists at the 2002 Asian Games
Cyclists at the 2006 Asian Games
Medalists at the 2006 Asian Games
Asian Games bronze medalists for South Korea
1983 births
20th-century South Korean women
21st-century South Korean women